Col des Champs (elevation ) is a high mountain pass in the Alps at the border between the departments of Alpes-de-Haute-Provence and Alpes-Maritimes in France. It connects Saint-Martin-d'Entraunes and Colmars, joining the valleys of the Var River and the Verdon River.

Together with the Col de la Cayolle and the Col d'Allos it forms part of a popular round trip for cyclists (see for example ).

Details of the climb
The western side, from Colmars, is 12.5 km long, climbing  at an average of 6.6%. The state of the pavement is partly very poor (as of August 2014). While some parts are recently renovated, others contain numerous potholes and are covered by loose gravel. On this side mountain pass cycling milestones for cyclists are placed approximately every kilometre. They indicate the current height, the distance to the summit, the average slope in the following passage, as well as the number of the street (D2).

Starting from Saint-Martin-d'Entraunes, the climb is 16.5 km gaining , resulting in an average of 6.4%. The state of the pavement is generally good on this side. No signposts for cyclists are placed on this side. However, every kilometre a sign indicates the altitude, as well as the distance to the summit (uphill) or the next villages (uphill and downhill).

The exact height
A topographic map  of the French Institut géographique national marks  at this position of the sign, and  some 50 metres away from the signpost.

References

External links
Profile on cyclos-cyclotes.org
Description on Quäldich.de (in German)
Cycling up to the Col des Champs: data, profile, map, photos and description

Mountain passes of Provence-Alpes-Côte d'Azur
Mountain passes of the Alps